The West Indies men's cricket team are touring South Africa in February and March 2023 to play two Test matches,  three One Day International (ODI) and three Twenty20 International (T20I) matches. The Test matches formed part of the 2021–2023 ICC World Test Championship. Cricket South Africa (CSA) confirmed the fixtures for the tour in October 2022.

Squads

On 6 March 2023, Anrich Nortje was ruled out of second test due to mild groin discomfort.

Initially, Aiden Markram, Marco Jansen, Heinrich Klaasen, David Miller and Wayne Parnell were selected only for the third match in South Africa's ODI squad. However on 13 March 2023, Parnell added to the squad for first two ODIs as an injury replacement for Wiaan Mulder, while Tabraiz Shamsi replaced injured Keshav Maharaj in South Africa's ODI squad. 

On 14 March 2023, Obed McCoy was ruled out from the West Indies' T20I squad due to knee injury, and was replaced by Roston Chase.

Tour match

Test series

1st Test

2nd Test

ODI series

1st ODI

2nd ODI

3rd ODI

T20I series

1st T20I

2nd T20I

3rd T20I

Notes

References

External links
 Series home at ESPNcricinfo

2023 in West Indian cricket
2023 in South African cricket
International cricket competitions in 2022–23
West Indian cricket tours of South Africa
Current cricket tours